Octadecadienoic acid may refer to:

 Conjugated linoleic acids
 Linoleic acid, (9Z,12Z)-9,12-octadecadienoic acid
 Linolelaidic acid, (9E,12E)-9,12-octadecadienoic acid
 Rumenic acid, (9Z,11E)-9,11-octadecadienoic acid